The Jacks–Manning Farm, also known as the Vinton Farm was built around 1840 for Robert Jacks near Charles Town, West Virginia, in the Greek Revival style. Jacks had married Julia Davenport, a member of a prominent Jefferson County family.  Their daughter, Rebecca Jacks, married Thomas J. Manning, and the property has remained in the hands of descendants of the Manning family.

References

Houses on the National Register of Historic Places in West Virginia
Houses in Jefferson County, West Virginia
Greek Revival houses in West Virginia
Houses completed in 1840
Farms on the National Register of Historic Places in West Virginia
National Register of Historic Places in Jefferson County, West Virginia